The 2024 United States Senate elections are scheduled to be held on November 5, 2024, as part of the 2024 United States elections. 33 of the 100 seats in the U.S. Senate will be contested in regular elections, the winners of which will serve 6-year terms in the U.S. Congress from January 3, 2025, to January 3, 2031, and one special election will be held to complete an unexpired term ending January 3, 2027. Senators are divided into three classes whose terms are staggered so that a different class is elected every two years. Class 1 senators, who were last elected in 2018, will be up for election again in 2024. Numerous other federal, state, and local elections, including the U.S. presidential election and elections to the House, will also be held on this date.

As of March 2023, 21 senators (15 Democrats and six Republicans) have announced plans to run for re-election. One Republican, Mike Braun, and two Democrats, Debbie Stabenow and Dianne Feinstein, have announced an intention to retire. Another Republican, Ben Sasse, resigned early to accept a position as president of the University of Florida; the governor of Nebraska appointed Pete Ricketts as the state's interim senator and a special election will take place concurrently with the 2024 regular Senate elections to fill the seat for the remainder of the term.

The map for these elections, like in the previous Class 1 Senate election in 2018, is considered by elections analysts to be unfavorable to Democrats, who will be defending 23 of the 33 seats of Class 1. Three Democrats in this class represent states won by Donald Trump in both 2016 and 2020 (Montana, Ohio, and West Virginia), while no Republicans represent states won by Joe Biden in 2020. Further, Democrats are defending seats in six states that Biden won by a single-digit margin (Wisconsin, Pennsylvania, Nevada, Michigan, Minnesota, and Maine) while Republicans are defending only two seats in states that Trump won by a single-digit margin (Florida and Texas). In the two previous Senate election cycles that coincided with presidential elections (2016 and 2020), only 1 senator (Republican Susan Collins of Maine in 2020) was elected in a state that was won by the presidential nominee of the opposite party.

Partisan composition 
All 33 Class 1 Senate seats and one Class 2 seat are up for election in 2024; Class 1 currently consists of 20 Democrats, 3 independents who caucus with the Senate Democrats, and 10 Republicans.

Change in composition 
Each block represents one of the one hundred seats in the U.S. Senate. "D#" is a Democratic/active senator, "I#" is an Independent senator, and "R#" is a Republican/active senator. They are arranged so that the parties are separated, and a majority is clear by crossing the middle.

Before the elections 
Each block indicates an incumbent senator's actions going into the election.

After the elections

Predictions 
Several sites and individuals published predictions of competitive seats. These predictions looked at factors such as the strength of the incumbent (if the incumbent was running for reelection) and the other candidates, and the state's partisan lean (reflected in part by the state's Cook Partisan Voting Index rating). The predictions assigned ratings to each seat, indicating the predicted advantage that a party had in winning that seat. Most election predictors used:
 "tossup": no advantage
 "tilt" (used by some predictors): advantage that is not quite as strong as "lean"
 "lean" or "leans": slight advantage
 "likely": significant, but surmountable, advantage
 "safe" or "solid": near-certain chance of victory<div style="overflow-x:auto;>

Retirements 
As of March 2023, three senators have announced plans to retire.

Race summary

Special elections during the preceding Congress 
In each special election, the winner's term begins immediately after their election is certified by their state's government.

Elections are sorted by date then state.

Elections leading to the next Congress 
In these general elections, the winners will be elected for the term beginning January 3, 2025.

Arizona 

One-term independent Kyrsten Sinema was elected in 2018 as a  Democrat with 50.0% of the vote. She left the Democratic Party in December 2022. She has filed paperwork to run for a second term, but has not made an official announcement. Sinema has received a cross-party endorsement from Senator Lisa Murkowski (R-AK).

Due to Sinema's opposition to some of President Joe Biden's agenda, she is considered vulnerable to challengers from the Democratic Party, with U.S. Representative Ruben Gallego running for the Democratic nomination.

2022 gubernatorial nominee Kari Lake and 2022 Senate nominee Blake Masters are considering running for the Republican nomination.

California 

Five-term Democrat Dianne Feinstein was re-elected in 2018 with 54.2% of the vote. On February 14, 2023, Feinstein announced that she will not seek re-election to a sixth term.

Educator Denice Gary-Pandol, Peter Liu, and Barack Mandela are the Republican candidates to declare their candidacies for the seat.

Democratic U.S. Representatives Barbara Lee, Katie Porter, and Adam Schiff have announced that they are running for the seat. Representative Ro Khanna is also considered a potential Democratic candidate.

Connecticut 

Two-term Democrat Chris Murphy was re-elected in 2018 with 59.5% of the vote. Murphy has announced he is running for a third term.

Delaware 

Four-term Democrat Tom Carper was re-elected in 2018 with 60.0% of the vote. During the Democratic primary of that race, Carper implied that he might not seek re-election in 2024, and, when asked about it, said, "This may be the last time." He has said "the options are wide open" on whether he runs again. Should Carper retire, U.S. Representative Lisa Blunt Rochester (D-DE) and Governor John Carney are both seen as potential candidates for the Democratic nomination, with Rochester having already expressed interest.

Florida 

Former Governor and incumbent one-term Republican Rick Scott was elected in 2018 with 50.06% of the vote. He is running for reelection to a second term. However, due to his role in a worse-than-expected midterm for Republicans, Scott is seen as vulnerable to a primary challenge. State prosecutor Keith Gross is expected to announce a primary challenge against Scott, with U.S. Representative Byron Donalds being seen as another potential candidate for the Republican nomination.

Former U.S. Representative Stephanie Murphy is seen as a potential challenger for the Democratic nomination.

Hawaii 

Two-term Democrat Mazie Hirono was re-elected in 2018 with 71.2% of the vote. Hirono is running for a third term.

Indiana 

One-term Republican Mike Braun was elected in 2018 with 50.8% of the vote. Braun is retiring to prepare to run for Governor of Indiana instead. U.S. representative Jim Banks is running, while former representative Trey Hollingsworth and Indiana attorney general and 2018 Senate candidate Todd Rokita are all seen as potential candidates for the Republican nomination to succeed Braun.

Former Senator Joe Donnelly is a potential challenger for the Democratic nomination in an effort to win back a seat that he lost in 2018. Mayor of Indianapolis, former Indiana Secretary of State, and former chair of the Indiana Democratic Party, Joe Hogsett is also seen as a potential candidate for the Democratic nomination.

Maine 

Two-term Independent incumbent Angus King was re-elected in 2018 with 54.3% of the vote. He intends to run for a third-term despite previously hinting that he may retire.

U.S. Representative Jared Golden (ME-02) is considered a potential candidate for the Democratic nomination.

Maryland 

Three-term Democrat Ben Cardin was re-elected in 2018 with 64.9% of the vote. Cardin is currently deciding on a potential retirement. Should he retire, U.S. representatives Jamie Raskin and David Trone, and Prince George's County Executive Angela Alsobrooks are seen as potential candidates in the Democratic primary.

Former state delegate Robin Ficker has filed paperwork to run for the Republican nomination. Former Lieutenant Governor (2003-2007), former chair of the Republican National Committee, and Republican nominee for the Senate in 2006, Michael Steele is also seen as a potential candidate.

Massachusetts 

Two-term Democrat Elizabeth Warren was re-elected in 2018 with 60.3% of the vote. On May 8, 2021, Warren confirmed that she plans to run for a third term.

Former Lieutenant Governor of Massachusetts Karyn Polito (2015-2023) is seen as a potential candidate for the Republican nomination.

Michigan 

Four-term Democrat Debbie Stabenow was re-elected in 2018 with 52.3% of the vote. She is retiring, and will not run for a fifth term. Representative Elissa Slotkin is running for the Democratic nomination.

Republican Nikki Snyder, a member of the Michigan State Board of Education, has also announced a bid for the seat. Pest control company owner, Michael Hoover, has filed paperwork to run. Congressman Bill Huizenga, former Congressman Peter Meijer (2021-2023), and Congresswoman Lisa McClain have expressed interest in running for the Republican nomination. 2022 candidate for Governor, Kevin Rinke, former Michigan Attorney General and Republican nominee for Governor in 2018, Bill Schuette, and former U.S. Secretary of Education, Betsy DeVos, are also seen as potential candidates.

Notably, on February 24, 2023, U.S. Representative John James, Republican nominee for the Senate in 2018 and 2020, has recently declined a third bid for the Senate, and a second bid for Stabenow's seat, as he is running for reelection. Republican nominee for Governor in 2022, Tudor Dixon and former Congressman Mike Rogers have also declined a Senate run.

Minnesota 

Three-term Democrat Amy Klobuchar was re-elected in 2018 with 60.3% of the vote. She has announced her intent to run for a fourth term.

Mississippi 

Two-term Republican Roger Wicker was re-elected in 2018 with 58.5% of the vote. Democrat Ty Pinkins is running against Wicker.

Missouri 

One-term Republican Josh Hawley was elected in 2018 with 51.4% of the vote. He is running for re-election.

Marine Veteran Lucas Kunce, who ran unsuccessfully for the Democratic nomination in 2022, has announced he is running again. December Harmon, a member of the Columbia Police Review Board, has also announced a run for the Democratic nomination.

Montana 

Three-term Democrat Jon Tester was re-elected in 2018 with 50.3% of the vote. On February 22, 2023, Tester announced he is running for a fourth term. Tester is one of three Democratic Senators who represent states won by Republican Donald Trump in 2016 and 2020.

U.S. Representatives Matt Rosendale and Ryan Zinke have expressed interest in challenging Tester, and Governor Greg Gianforte and Montana Attorney General Austin Knudsen are also considered potential Republican candidates.

Nebraska 

There will be two elections in Nebraska, due to the resignation of Ben Sasse.

Nebraska (regular)

Two-term Republican Deb Fischer was re-elected in 2018 with 57.7% of the vote. On May 14, 2021, Fischer announced she is seeking reelection, despite previously declaring an intention to retire.

Democrat Alisha Shelton, a mental health practitioner from Omaha, has announced a run for the Democratic nomination in order to challenge Fischer.

Nebraska (special)

Two-term Republican Ben Sasse resigned his seat on January 8, 2023, to become President of the University of Florida. Former governor and 2006 Senate nominee Pete Ricketts was appointed by Governor Jim Pillen and a special election for the seat will take place concurrently with the 2024 regular Senate elections. Ricketts and Air Force Veteran John Glen Weaver have declared their candidacies for the Republican nomination.

Nevada 

One-term Democrat Jacky Rosen was elected in 2018 with 50.4% of the vote. Rosen is running for a second term.

Adam Laxalt, former Nevada Attorney General, Republican nominee for Governor in 2018, and Republican nominee for Senator in 2022, could potentially challenge Rosen for her seat. Other potential Republican challengers include businessman Sam Brown, a candidate for the Republican nomination for the Senate in 2022, reality television personality Rick Harrison, and venture capitalist Guy Nohra.

New Jersey 

Three-term Democrat Bob Menendez was re-elected in 2018 with 54.0% of the vote. On July 13, 2021, The New Jersey Globe stated that Menendez plans to run for a fourth term. Social worker Christina Khalil and mayor Joe Signorello have announced primary challenges against Menendez.

Educator, and former member of the Andover Township Board of Education, Daniel Cruz has declared his candidacy for the Republican nomination.

New Mexico 

Two-term Democrat Martin Heinrich was re-elected in 2018 with 54.1% of the vote. Heinrich has announced his intent to run for a third term.

New York 

Two-term Democrat Kirsten Gillibrand was re-elected in 2018 with 67.0% of the vote. Gillibrand is running for a third full term. Former Representative of New York's 1st congressional district and Republican nominee for Governor of New York in 2022, Lee Zeldin, has publicly expressed interest in seeking the Republican nomination to challenge Gillibrand.

North Dakota 

One-term Republican Kevin Cramer was elected in 2018 with 55.1% of the vote.

Democrat Kristin Hedger, a businesswoman and nominee for North Dakota secretary of state in 2006 has filed paperwork to run for Cramer's seat. However, she has yet to make an official announcement.

Ohio 

Three-term Democrat Sherrod Brown was re-elected in 2018 with 53.4% of the vote. Brown is running for a fourth term.

Republican State Senator Matt Dolan has announced his candidacy, and Ohio Secretary of State Frank LaRose is considered another potential challenger to Brown.

Pennsylvania 

Three-term Democrat Bob Casey Jr., was re-elected in 2018 with 55.7% of the vote. Casey has announced his intention to run for a fourth term.

2022 Senate nominee Mehmet Oz, 2022 Senate primary candidate David McCormick, and 2022 gubernatorial nominee Doug Mastriano are considered potential Republican candidates.

Rhode Island 

Three-term Democrat Sheldon Whitehouse was re-elected in 2018 with 61.4% of the vote. Whitehouse is running for a fourth term.

Tennessee 

One-term Republican Marsha Blackburn was elected in 2018 with 54.7% of the vote. Blackburn has filed paperwork to run for reelection.

Texas 

Two-term Republican Ted Cruz was re-elected in 2018 with 50.9% of the vote. Cruz is running for a third-term despite advocating for congressional term limits. He has also expressed interest in running for president in 2024.

Former U.S. Secretary of Housing and Urban Development and former Mayor of San Antonio Julián Castro, U.S. Representative Colin Allred, Texas State Senator Roland Gutierrez, and Texas State Representative James Talarico are considered possible Democratic candidates.

Utah 

One-term Republican Mitt Romney was elected in 2018 with 62.6% of the vote. Romney has expressed uncertainty over his political future following his votes to convict Trump on impeachment, and his indicated that he will announce a decision on reelection by mid-April 2023. Should he run, Romney has the endorsement of Senate Minority Leader Mitch McConnell.

Attorney General of Utah Sean Reyes and Former U.S. representative Jason Chaffetz are considered possible Republican primary challengers.

Vermont 

Three-term independent Bernie Sanders was re-elected in 2018 with 67.4% of the vote.

Potential Democratic candidates include former Vermont attorney general, T. J. Donovan, and incumbent Vermont lieutenant governor, David Zuckerman, a Progressive.

Virginia 

Two-term Democrat Tim Kaine was re-elected in 2018 with 57.0% of the vote. On January 20, 2023, Kaine confirmed he is running for reelection to a third term. Governor Glenn Youngkin, who will be term-limited in 2026, is considered a possible Republican candidate.

Washington 

Four-term Democrat Maria Cantwell was re-elected in 2018 with 58.3% of the vote. She has announced her intent to run for a fifth term.

West Virginia 

Two-term Democrat Joe Manchin was re-elected in 2018 with 49.6% of the vote. There have been reports that Manchin plans to run for a third full term. However, on October 5, 2022, Manchin said, "What I do in 2024 has nothing to do with what I do right now," and was watching the 2022 elections before making a decision.

Republican congressman Alex Mooney and Republican Chris Rose have announced they are challenging Manchin, while governor Jim Justice and attorney general Patrick Morrisey have publicly expressed interest in entering the race.

Manchin has received cross-party endorsements from fellow senators Susan Collins (R-ME) and Lisa Murkowski (R-AK).

Wisconsin 

Two-term Democrat Tammy Baldwin was re-elected in 2018 with 55.4% of the vote. She has announced her intention to run for a third term. Hedge fund manager Eric Hovde, candidate for the Senate in 2012, has publicly expressed interest in a second attempt at earning the Republican nomination. Congressman Mike Gallagher (WI-08), former Congressman Sean Duffy (2011-2019), and Congressman Bryan Steil (WI-01) are seen as potential Republican challengers.

Wyoming 

Two-term Republican John Barrasso was re-elected in 2018 with 67.0% of the vote.

See also
 2024 United States elections
 2024 United States gubernatorial elections
 2024 United States presidential election
 2024 United States House of Representatives elections
 118th United States Congress
 119th United States Congress

Notes

References